Casella is the most populous frazione (hamlet) of the municipality of Asolo, Italy with a population of 4,500. The hamlet covers an area of 6 km2, sitting 97–108 m above sea level. Casella lies 1.5 km from downtown Asolo.
See also https://it.wikipedia.org/wiki/Villa Barbini-Rinaldi

See also
 Asolo
 Pagnano

References

Cities and towns in Veneto
Frazioni of the Province of Treviso